Błotno  is a village in the administrative district of Gmina Zwierzyn, within Strzelce-Drezdenko County, Lubusz Voivodeship, in western Poland.

References

Villages in Strzelce-Drezdenko County